BDZ may refer to:
 Benzodiazepines, a class of drugs
 Bulgarian State Railways (Balgarski Darzhavni Zheleznitsi in Bulgarian)
 BDZ (album), a 2018 album by Twice
 "BDZ" (song), a song from the album
 bdz, the ISO 639-3 code of the Badeshi language